The Pingquan North railway station is a station on the Beijing–Shenyang high-speed railway located in Pingquan County, Hebei.

See also
Pingquan railway station

Railway stations in Hebei
Stations on the Beijing–Harbin High-Speed Railway